Chrothildis (7th-century – 692) was a Frankish queen consort by marriage to king Theuderic III.  She was formally the nominal regent for her son Clovis IV during his minority from his succession in 691 until her own death in 692, though in reality the de facto regent was Pepin of Herstal.

References 

Frankish queens consort
692 deaths
7th-century births
Merovingian dynasty
7th-century Frankish women
7th-century women rulers
Queen mothers